Johan Gallon (born 10 April 1978) is a French former football player. He was manager of US Granville from 2013 until 2021.

References

External links

1978 births
Living people
French footballers
French expatriate footballers
French football managers
Expatriate footballers in Switzerland
Expatriate footballers in Spain
Ligue 2 players
Stade Malherbe Caen players
Étoile Carouge FC players
Clermont Foot players
Stade Brestois 29 players
Racing de Ferrol footballers
FC Istres players
Footballers from Caen
Association football midfielders